Zoran Barisic (born 22 May 1970) is an Croatian-Austrian football manager and a former player. He is currently the sporting director of Rapid Vienna and also the caretaker manager for the club.

Managerial statistics

Honours

Player
Rapid Vienna
 Austrian Bundesliga: 1995–96
 Austrian Cup: 1994–95

Tirol Innsbruck
 Austrian Bundesliga: 1999–2000, 2000–01, 2001–02

References

External links 
 Profile at Rapidarchiv 

1970 births
Living people
Footballers from Vienna
Austrian people of Croatian descent
Austrian footballers
Association football midfielders
Austria international footballers
Austrian football managers
Wiener Sport-Club players
FC Admira Wacker Mödling players
SK Rapid Wien players
SK Rapid Wien managers
FC Tirol Innsbruck players
Austrian Football Bundesliga players
NK Olimpija Ljubljana (2005) managers
Expatriate football managers in Slovenia
Austrian expatriate sportspeople in Slovenia
Austrian expatriate football managers
Expatriate football managers in Turkey
Austrian expatriate sportspeople in Turkey